Fabien Di Filippo (born 23 August 1986) is a French politician of The Republicans who was elected to the French National Assembly on 18 June 2017, representing the 4th constituency of Moselle.

Political career
In parliament, Di Filippo serves on the Committee on Economic Affairs. From 2018 until 2019, he was also a member of the Defence Committee.

In the Republicans’ 2017 leadership election, Di Filippo endorsed Laurent Wauquiez and later joined his campaign's team.

Di Filippo was re-elected in the 2022 French legislative election.

Political positions
In July 2019, Di Filippo voted against the French ratification of the European Union’s Comprehensive Economic and Trade Agreement (CETA) with Canada.

See also 
 2017 French legislative election

References 

1986 births
Living people
The Republicans (France) politicians
Deputies of the 15th National Assembly of the French Fifth Republic
French people of Italian descent
Sciences Po alumni
People from Sarrebourg
Politicians from Grand Est

Deputies of the 16th National Assembly of the French Fifth Republic
Members of Parliament for Moselle